Elassovalene (2a,8b-dihydro-cyclopent[cd]azulene) is a polycyclic hydrocarbon with chemical formula C12H10, composed of one cycloheptatriene ring and two fused cyclopentene rings.

See also 
 List of chemical compounds with unusual names
 Azulene
 Homoaromaticity

References

Polycyclic nonaromatic hydrocarbons
Cyclopentenes